WEKB (1460 AM) is a radio station broadcasting a contemporary Christian format. Licensed to Elkhorn City, Kentucky, United States, the station is currently owned by Lynn Parrish, through licensee Mountain Top Media LLC.

History
The station went on the air as WBPA on 1979-10-09.  On 2005-03-23, the station changed its call sign to the current WEKB.

Previous logo

References

External links

Pike County, Kentucky
Radio stations established in 1979
1979 establishments in Kentucky
EKB
Sports in Kentucky